Home Guardsman Bruggler is a 1936 German war film directed by Werner Klingler and starring Ludwig Kerscher, Franziska Kinz and Rolf Pinegger. It is set in the Tyrol during the First World War and depicts the activities of the local home guard unit. It was based on a novel by Anton Graf Bossi-Fedrigotti, itself based on the diary of the titular Anton Bruggler. Location shooting took place in the Dolomites.

Cast and characters
 Ludwig Kerscher as Toni Bruggler
 Franziska Kinz as Mother Bruggler
 Rolf Pinegger as Grandfather Bruggler
 Eduard Köck as Anderl Theissbacher
 Viktor Gehring as Waldemar
 Friedrich Ulmer as Hans Oberwexer
 Beppo Brem as Jorgl Trimml
 Lola Chlud as Countess von Teuff
 Gustl Gstettenbaur as Bartl Theissbacher
 Hans Hanauer as Sepp Thaler
 Fritz Hofbauer as Sebastian Mutschechner
 Willy Schultes as Hannes Baumgartner

References

Bibliography

External links

1936 films
Films of Nazi Germany
1936 war films
German war films
1930s German-language films
Films directed by Werner Klingler
Films set in Austria
Films set in the Alps
Films set in the 1910s
World War I films set on the Italian Front
Films based on Austrian novels
Films based on Italian novels
German black-and-white films
UFA GmbH films
1930s German films